Bacchus Marsh Grammar School is an independent, co-educational, Christian, primary and secondary day school located in Maddingley, Australia.

History
Bacchus Marsh Grammar School opened in February 1988. It has grown from three classrooms, to a school of three campuses and more than 2300 pupils from Preparatory to Year 12.

The school is known for its increasingly strong VCE results  . The school's highest achieving students have scored ATARs of 99.95, with several students also achieving a perfect study score of 50+ in a variety of subjects.

The school consists of four houses, Bacchus (blue), Braeside (white), Hilton (gold) and Pentland (black), who contest the House Shield each year. The houses compete in a number of events including athletics, chess, music, drama, swimming, cross-country and community singing.

In 2015 Bacchus Marsh Grammar received negative press for its treatment of a transgender student Erik Ly. Erik claims he told staff he was transgender but still had to wear "the girls uniform". Erik says he plans to lodge a complaint about the independent schools with the Victorian Equal Opportunity and Human Rights Commission when he has finished his VCE Ly moved to a public school that has gender-neutral bathrooms to complete High school.

Locations
Bacchus Marsh Grammar School is located in Bacchus Marsh. The campus there was built in 1988, and replaced the original campus located on Hallett's Way. In 2019, Bacchus Marsh grammar opened up a new campus for middle school students in Aintree.

References

External links
Bacchus Marsh Grammar School website

Educational institutions established in 1988
Grammar schools in Australia
Private secondary schools in Victoria (Australia)
Bacchus Marsh
1988 establishments in Australia